Hierarchical classification is a system of grouping things according to a hierarchy.

In the field of machine learning, hierarchical classification is sometimes referred to as instance space decomposition, which splits a complete multi-class problem into a set of smaller classification problems.

See also 
 Deductive classifier
 Cascading classifiers
 Faceted classification

References

External links 
 Hierarchical Classification – a useful approach for predicting thousands of possible categories

Classification algorithms